Dame Penelope Margaret Lively   (née  Low; born 17 March 1933) is a British writer of fiction for both children and adults. Lively has won both the Booker Prize (Moon Tiger, 1987) and the Carnegie Medal for British children's books (The Ghost of Thomas Kempe, 1973).

Children's fiction
Lively first achieved success with children's fiction. Her first book, Astercote, was published by Heinemann in 1970. It is a low fantasy novel set in a Cotswolds village and the neighbouring woodland site of a medieval village wiped out by Plague.

Lively published more than twenty books for children, achieving particular recognition with The Ghost of Thomas Kempe and A Stitch in Time. For the former she won the 1973 Carnegie Medal from the Library Association, recognising the year's best children's book by a British subject. For the latter she won the 1976 Whitbread Children's Book Award. The three novels feature local history, roughly 600, 300, and 100 years past, in ways that approach time slip but do not posit travel to the past.

Adult works
Lively's first novel for adults, The Road to Lichfield, was published in 1977 and made the shortlist for the Booker Prize. She repeated the feat in 1984 with According to Mark, and won the 1987 prize for Moon Tiger, which tells the story of a woman's tempestuous life as she lies dying in a hospital bed. As with all of Lively's fiction, Moon Tiger is marked by a close attention to the power of memory, the impact of the past upon the present, and the tensions between "official" and personal histories. She explored the same themes more explicitly in her nonfiction works, including A House Unlocked (2001) and Oleander, Jacaranda: A Childhood Perceived (1994), a memoir of her Egyptian childhood. Her latest nonfiction work Ammonites & Leaping Fish: A Life in Time, (latterly known as Dancing Fish and Ammonites: A Memoir) was published in 2013.

Beside novels and short stories, Lively has also written radio and television scripts, presented a radio programme, and contributed reviews and articles to various newspapers and journals.

Personal life
Lively married academic and political theorist Jack Lively in 1957. They had a son and a daughter. Her husband died in 1998. She currently lives in London. Her house contains paintings, woodcuts and Egyptian potsherds.

The journalist Valentine Low is Lively's half-brother.

Honours
Lively is a Fellow of the Royal Society of Literature.  She is also a vice-president of the Friends of the British Library. She was appointed Officer of the Order of the British Empire (OBE) in 1989, Commander of the Order of the British Empire (CBE) in 2001, and Dame Commander of the Order of the British Empire (DBE) in the 2012 New Year Honours for services to literature.

Lively was shortlisted for the Booker Prize: once in 1977 for her first novel, The Road to Lichfield, and again in 1984 for According to Mark. She won the 1987 Booker Prize for her novel Moon Tiger.

Books

Fiction for children
 Astercote (1970)
 The Whispering Knights (1971)
 The Wild Hunt of Hagworthy (1971)
 The Driftway (1972)
 The Ghost of Thomas Kempe (1973) – Carnegie Medal 
 The House in Norham Gardens (1974)
 Going Back (1975)
 Boy Without a Name (1975)
 A Stitch in Time (1976) – Whitbread Children's Book Award
 The Stained Glass Window (1976), illustrated by Michael Pollard 
 Fanny's Sister (1976)
 The Voyage of QV66 (1978)
 Fanny and the Monsters (1979)
 Fanny and the Battle of Potter's Piece (1980)
 The Revenge of Samuel Stokes (1981)
 Uninvited Ghosts and other stories (1984), collection
 Dragon Trouble (1984), illus. Valerie Littlewood 
 Debbie and the Little Devil (1987)
 A House Inside Out (1987)
 Princess by Mistake (1993)
 Judy and the Martian (1993)
 The Cat, the Crow and the Banyan Tree (1994), illus. Terry Milne 
 Good Night, Sleep Tight (1995), illus. Adriano Gon
 Two Bears and Joe (1995), illus. Jan Ormerod 
 Staying with Grandpa (1995)
 A Martian Comes to Stay (1995)
 The Disastrous Dog (1995), illus. Robert Bartlett 
 Ghostly Guests (1997)
 One, Two, Three ... Jump! (1998), illus. Jan Ormerod 
 Dragon Trouble (1999), new edition illus. Andrew Rowland 
 In Search of a Homeland: The Story of The Aeneid (2001), illus. Ian Andrew

Fiction for adults
 The Road to Lichfield (1977) – Booker Prize finalist
 Nothing Missing but the Samovar, and other stories (1978), collection – Southern Arts Literature Prize
 Treasures of Time (1979) – Arts Council National Book Award
 Judgment Day (1980)
 Next to Nature, Art (1982)
 Perfect Happiness (1983)
 Corruption, and other stories (1984), collection
 According to Mark (1984) – Booker Prize finalist
 Pack of Cards, collected short stories 1978–1986 (1986), collection
 Moon Tiger (1987) – Booker Prize; Whitbread finalist
 Passing On (1989)
 City of the Mind (1991)
 Cleopatra's Sister (1993)
 Heat Wave (1996)
 Beyond the Blue Mountains (1997), collection (U.S. title: The Five Thousand and One Nights)
 Spiderweb (1998)
 The Photograph (2003)
 Making it up (2005)
 Consequences (2007)
 Family Album (2009) – Costa finalist
 How It All Began (November 2011)
 The Purple Swamp Hen and Other stories (May 2017)

Nonfiction
 The Presence of the Past: An introduction to landscape history (1976)
 Oleander, Jacaranda: a Childhood Perceived (1994), autobiographical
 A House Unlocked (2001), autobiographical
 Ammonites and Leaping Fish (2013), memoir (subsequently Dancing Fish and Ammonites: A Memoir)
 Life in the Garden (2018), memoir

References

External links

 
 
 Audio slideshow interview about Family Album on The Interview Online
 
Interview with Penelope Lively, ALL ABOUT KIDS! TV Series, Episode #165 (1994)
Interview with Penelope Lively, A DISCUSSION WITH National Authors on Tour TV Series, Episode #79 (1994)

1933 births
Living people
Writers from Cairo
British children's writers
British fantasy writers
Booker Prize winners
Carnegie Medal in Literature winners
Dames Commander of the Order of the British Empire
Fellows of the Royal Society of Literature
Alumni of St Anne's College, Oxford
20th-century British novelists
21st-century British novelists
20th-century British women writers
21st-century British women writers
British women short story writers
British women children's writers
Women science fiction and fantasy writers
British women novelists